Pterorhinus is a genus of passerine birds in the laughingthrush family Leiothrichidae.

Taxonomy
The genus was erected by the English zoologist Robert Swinhoe in 1868 with the plain laughingthrush (Pterorhinus davidi) as the type species. The name of the genus combines the Ancient Greek pteron meaning "feather" with rhinos meaning "nostrils".

These species were at one time placed in Garrulax but following the publication of a molecular phylogenetic study in 2018, Garrulax was split up and some of the species were moved to the resurrected genus Pterorhinus. At the same time, the four species previously placed in Babax were moved here.

Species
The genus contains 23 species:
 Rufous-necked laughingthrush, Pterorhinus ruficollis
 Chestnut-backed laughingthrush, Pterorhinus nuchalis
 Black-throated laughingthrush, Pterorhinus chinensis
 Chestnut-capped laughingthrush, Pterorhinus mitratus
 Chestnut-hooded laughingthrush, Pterorhinus treacheri
 White-cheeked laughingthrush, Pterorhinus vassali
 Yellow-throated laughingthrush, Pterorhinus galbanus
 Blue-crowned laughingthrush, Pterorhinus courtoisi – split from P. galbanus
 Rufous-vented laughingthrush, Pterorhinus gularis
 Wayanad laughingthrush, Pterorhinus delesserti
 White-throated laughingthrush, Pterorhinus albogularis
 Rufous-crowned laughingthrush, Pterorhinus ruficeps 
 Plain laughingthrush, Pterorhinus davidi 
 Greater necklaced laughingthrush, Pterorhinus pectoralis
 Rusty laughingthrush, Pterorhinus poecilorhynchus
 Grey-sided laughingthrush, Pterorhinus caerulatus
 Buffy laughingthrush, Pterorhinus berthemyi
 Chinese babax, Pterorhinus lanceolatus – moved from Babax
 Mount Victoria babax, Pterorhinus woodi – moved from Babax
 Giant babax, Pterorhinus waddelli – moved from Babax
 Tibetan babax, Pterorhinus koslowi – moved from Babax
 White-browed laughingthrush, Pterorhinus sannio
 Masked laughingthrush, Pterorhinus perspicillatus

References

 Collar, N. J. & Robson, C. 2007. Family Timaliidae (Babblers)  pp. 70 – 291 in; del Hoyo, J., Elliott, A. & Christie, D.A. eds. Handbook of the Birds of the World, Vol. 12. Picathartes to Tits and Chickadees. Lynx Edicions, Barcelona.

 
Bird genera
Leiothrichidae
Taxa named by Robert Swinhoe